Berlin in Berlin is a 1993 Turkish drama film directed by Sinan Çetin. It was entered into the 18th Moscow International Film Festival where Hülya Avşar won the award for Best Actress.

Cast
 Hülya Avşar as Dilber
 Cem Özer as Muertuez
 Armin Block as Thomas
 Aliye Rona as Ugu
 Eşref Kolçak as Ekber
 Nilüfer Aydan as Zehra
 Clemens-Maria Haas as Olaf
 Zafer Ergin as Mehmet
 Emrah Aydemir as Yueksel
 Volkan Akabali as Yuecel

References

External links
 

1993 films
1993 drama films
Turkish drama films
1990s Turkish-language films
1990s German-language films
Films set in Berlin
Films shot in Berlin
1993 multilingual films
Turkish multilingual films